Elizabeth Janangelo (born October 12, 1983) is an American professional golfer currently playing on the Futures Tour.

Early life and amateur career
Born and raised in West Hartford, Connecticut, Janangelo began playing golf at age two.
At age 13 she won the Connecticut State Women's Amateur Golf Championship, the youngest champion in state history. She went on to win that Championship four more times.

As a junior golfer, Janangelo won eight American Junior Golf Association (AJGA) titles, including two major titles. She enrolled at Duke University on a golf scholarship in the fall of 2002 and immediately found success. She was named ACC Rookie of the Year and All-ACC in her first year. In her second year, Janangelo won four tournaments, broke the Duke scoring average record, was named NGCA National Player of the Year, won the Golfstat Cup, and was named ACC Player of the Year. She ended her college career with seven career wins, second on the Duke all-time wins list.

While still an amateur, Janangelo qualified to play in the U.S. Women's Open four times, beginning as a sixteen-year-old in 2000. She has finished as high as tied for 30th.

Janangelo was a former golfer at Wampanoag Country Club.

Notable amateur wins
 1997 Connecticut State Women's Amateur
 2003 Connecticut State Women's Amateur
 2004 Connecticut State Women's Amateur
 2005 Connecticut State Women's Amateur
 2002–2006 Seven wins as member of Duke University golf team

Professional career
After graduating from Duke in May 2006, Janangelo was immediately eligible to play on the Futures Tour based on her high ranking in the 2006 Golfweek Collegiate rankings. She played in seven events in the remainder of the 2006 season, making the cut in six. In the fall of 2006, she attended LPGA Tour qualifying school where she failed to qualify and returned to the Futures Tour for 2007. She won her first tournament in the second event of the Futures Tour 2007 season, the Greater Tampa Duramed FUTURES Classic.

In 2007, Janangelo earned $45,084 and finished sixth on the Futures Tour money list, one spot out of automatic qualifying for fully exempt status for 2008 on the LPGA Tour.

In December 2007 she qualified for the LGPA Tour for the 2008 season by finishing among the top 17 players in the final LPGA Qualifying tournament.

She finished 147th on the official LPGA money list in 2008 forcing her to return to the LPGA qualifying tournament in order to retain her Tour card for 2009. At the Final Qualifying Tournament in December 2008, Janangelo finished tied for 60th place, not enough to retain LPGA membership for 2009. As a result, she returned to the Futures Tour.

In 2009, she played as a full-time player on the Duramed Futures Tour and finished in 18th place on the money list. This gave her an automatic bid to the Final Round of the LPGA Qualifying tournament, where she regained her LPGA Tour card for the 2010 season.

Professional wins (2)

Futures Tour (2)
2007 (2) Greater Tampa Duramed FUTURES Classic, Mercedes-Benz of Kansas City Championship

Results in LPGA majors

DNP = did not play
CUT = missed the half-way cut
WD = withdrew
T tied
Yellow background for a top-10 finish.

Team appearances
Amateur
Curtis Cup (representing the United States): 2004 (winners)

References

External links

Biography on Duke University golf team web site

American female golfers
Duke Blue Devils women's golfers
LPGA Tour golfers
Golfers from Connecticut
College golf coaches in the United States
People from West Hartford, Connecticut
1983 births
Living people